Fadhila Nafati is a Tunisian Paralympic athlete. She represented Tunisia at the Summer Paralympics in 2012, 2016 and 2021. She won the bronze medal in the women's shot put F54 event in 2016.

Achievements

References

External links 
 

Living people
Year of birth missing (living people)
Place of birth missing (living people)
Athletes (track and field) at the 2012 Summer Paralympics
Athletes (track and field) at the 2016 Summer Paralympics
Athletes (track and field) at the 2020 Summer Paralympics
Medalists at the 2016 Summer Paralympics
Paralympic bronze medalists for Tunisia
Paralympic medalists in athletics (track and field)
Paralympic athletes of Tunisia
Tunisian female shot putters
Tunisian female javelin throwers
Wheelchair shot putters
Wheelchair javelin throwers
21st-century Tunisian women